NCAA Season 80  is the 2004–05 season of the National Collegiate Athletic Association (Philippines). It is divided into two divisions: Seniors division for college students, and the Juniors division for high school students.

Seniors' basketball tournament

The 2004 edition of the postseason tournament started on September 8, 2004 and ended on September 22, 2004, with the Philippine Christian University (PCU) Dolphins winning their first NCAA Basketball championship at the expense of the University of Perpetual Help Dalta System (UPHDS) Altas. PCU's Robert Sanz was adjudged as the Finals MVP.

Elimination round
At end of the elimination round, the PCU Dolphins and the UPHDS Altas emerged at the top of the standings with identical 10-4 cards. The UPHDS Altas got the first seed by virtue of having a better points difference (UPHDS won the first game by 13 points, while PCU won the second game by nine points). Defending champions Letran Knights followed at third. Three teams were tied for the last Semi-Final berth. UPHDS, PCU and Letran received automatic semi-final berths.

Playoffs

Juniors' basketball tournament
In the NCAA Junior's Basketball Tournament, San Beda High beat Letran High in three games to capture their third straight title. Rogemar Menor was named Finals MVP.

Semi finals
At the Semi Finals, the San Beda Red Cubs eliminated the La Salle Greenies to enter in the NCAA Finals.

The Letran Squires eliminated the PCU Baby Dolphins to capture the other final berth.

Finals
The San Beda Red Cubs meets the Letran Squires, the only team that beat them during the Regular Season.

Bracket

See also
 UAAP Season 67

2004 in multi-sport events
2004 in Philippine sport
2005 in multi-sport events
2005 in Philippine sport
80